On 1 November 2018, suspected militants of ULFA (Independent) massacred five Bengali Hindus on the banks of Brahmaputra near Kherbari village in Tinsukia district of Assam. Chief Minister Sarbananda Sonowal condemned the killings. Mamata Banerjee, the Chief Minister of West Bengal condemned the killings and pointed towards the NRC process as the trigger behind the killings. ULFA (Independent) denied any involvement in the massacre.

Background 
As early as in 2016, ULFA warned Bengali Hindu individuals and organizations not to support the Citizenship (Amendment) Bill. On 13 October, the ULFA (Independent) detonated a low intensity bomb in Guwahati to warn the Bengali Hindu organizations protesting the exclusion of names of Bengali Hindu refugees from the NRC. It claimed that the Bengali Hindu organizations were working against the interests of the indigenous Assamese people and conspiring against Assam. A week before the incident, Assam Police received intelligence input about attacks in Bengali inhabited areas. On 25 November the pro-talk faction of the ULFA leadership stated that the Citizenship (Amendment) Bill, 2016 must be stopped from being passed at the Parliament. If it gets passed, he threatened to turn Assam into a 1983-like situation where the Bengali people would be massacred again.

Killings 
In the evening of 1 November 2018, six or seven Bengali Hindu youths were relaxing at a shop and playing ludo in the Kherbari village. Around 8-30 PM IST five or six unidentified gunmen arrived at the spot and rounded up the youths. They were taken to the banks of the Brahmaputra river, about six kilometers from the Dhola-Sadiya bridge. The gunmen forced the youths to sit on a line. At around 8:55 PM IST the gunmen opened fire on the youths from a point blank range. Five out of the seven people died on the spot. The two critically injured survivors were rushed to the hospital.

Reactions 
Chief Minister Sarbananda Sonowal condemned the killings. Sushmita Dev, Member of Parliament from Silchar too condemned the killings. Mamata Banerjee, the Chief Minister of West Bengal condemned the killings and lay the blame on the NRC process.

References 

2018 murders in Asia
2018 murders in India
2010s in Assam
Mass murder in 2018
21st-century mass murder in India
Massacres of Bengali Hindus in India
November 2018 crimes in Asia
November 2018 events in India
Tinsukia district
Massacres of Bengali Hindus in Assam
Massacres of Bengalis in Assam